Maggie Van Ostrand (born Margaret Rinhard in Queens, New York City) is an American humorist best known for her newspaper column which appears in the United States, Mexico and Canada. She is also known within the entertainment industry for ghostwriting satire and stand-up comedy, and ghosting for television sitcoms.

Van Ostrand is a regular contributor to the Chicago Tribune, and her articles have appeared in the Boston Globe, Amarillo Globe-News, Newsday, and other publications.

In 1998, 2001, 2003, and 2004 she received Outstanding Literary Achievement awards and, in 2002, Best Article of the Year award from two English-language Mexican publications. In 2004 she was recognized as Strike Force Member of the Year by the National Society of Newspaper Columnists.

Van Ostrand has appeared on network television news in support of a postage stamp featuring the thoroughbred racehorse Seabiscuit, as keynote speaker at conferences nationwide, and on radio, as a Woman of Significance, discussing Mexico. She also appears in a satirical documentary on emigration, based partly on one of her columns, produced by two award-winners, Abraham Osuna and M.K. Asante, Jr., the latter having just completed a film on Kwanzaa narrated by and co-written with renowned poet Dr.  Maya Angelou.

Van Ostrand is a member of the following organizations: National Society of Newspaper Columnists, Society of Women Writers and Journalists, U.K., and Erma Bombeck Humor Writers Workshop.

She has been a judge of the Erma Bombeck Writers' Competition since 2004, and in 2007 served as a judge of the Arizona Press Club's Journalism Award. Her essay on the origin of the word "gringo" appears in Stanford University's World Association of International Studies, January 2006.

Career 

Van Ostrand's writing career began with the liner notes for a Roger Miller album, and she began writing professionally upon the death of her friend and mentor Mark Goodson, for whose show Trivia Trap she was head writer. Other Mark Goodson game shows on which she worked in varying capacities were Card Sharks, The Price Is Right, Family Feud, To Tell The Truth (1990–91) and That's My Line (reality show).

In 1978 she was the theatrical agent instrumental in galvanizing the acting career of Wilford Brimley. She has also worked with entertainment management which represented the careers of Andy Williams, Mary Tyler Moore, and Bob Newhart.

Quotes 

 "The way to a man's heart is through his stomach. The way to a woman's is through her ears."
 "Women want men to respect our whims of iron."
 "Not even Harvey Weinstein understands why Roman numerals are used at the end of movies."
 "Make a terrorist stand all day long in four-inch heels. If he doesn't give up everything he knows after that, he's probably already dead."
 "There are two indisputable indications of uncommon bravery. The first is when the military earn their medals, and the second is when the moms earn their wrinkles."
 "Guilt is indispensable to a mother. It's as important as football, and as easily applied as lipstick."
 "Take the fear from in front of you where it inhibits, and place it behind you where it impels."
 "With the abundance of room and people scents available today, about the only thing that smells the same as it always did is the end of the nozzle at a gas pump."
 "He's so manly, he sweats diesel fuel."

External links 
Maggie Van Ostrand's Web Site
National Society of Newspaper Columnists
Society of Women Writers and Journalists
Erma Bombeck Writer's Workshop
American Online Columnists
Texas Escapes
Mexico Connect
Chapala
Humor Guru
Mountain Enterprise
Fandomania

American columnists
American humorists
Year of birth missing (living people)
Living people
Writers from Queens, New York
Chicago Tribune people
Journalists from New York City
Women humorists
American women columnists
21st-century American women